Charles Flaxman (25 December 1806 – November 1869) was employed by George Angas as his chief clerk. Flaxman received a loan from Angas to invest in land in South Australia. He travelled to Australia aboard the Prince George in 1838. He took up land in Tanunda, and Flaxman Valley in the area is named after him. His death was reported on 9 November 1869.

References

 "Prince George (dep Hamburg) 1838"

External links
 Sir Charles Bright Papers On Charles Flaxman at Flinders University library

1806 births
1869 deaths
People from South Australia
Settlers of South Australia